Dita e Verës or Verëza (English: "The Summer Day") is an Albanian spring festival and pagan holiday celebrated in Albania on March 14 of the Gregorian calendar (March 1 of the Julian calendar). In the old Albanian calendar, Verëza corresponds to the first three days of the new year and marks the end of the winter season (the second half of the year) and the beginning of the summer season (the first half of the year) on the spring equinox. Dita e Verës has its roots in traditional Albanian, Greek and Roman religions. Another festival of the spring equinox observed in Albania is Nowruz, celebrated on March 22.

Description 
Dita e Verës is celebrated on March 1 of the Julian calendar, the first day of the new year (which is March 14 in the Gregorian calendar). It is celebrated both in the Northern and Southern regions, but with regional differences. Bonfires are traditionally lit in yards elsewhere in Albania with the function to drive away the darkness of the winter season and for the strengthening of the Sun.

The shrine of Diana of Cermenika, located in the Albanian city of Elbasan, celebrates Diana the goddess of forests, greenery and nature. The distinctive sign of this holiday is baking ballokume, a sugar cookie made with Albanian corn. In Lezha, Dita e Verës fires are lit to signify the sun's purity and strength. Although the holiday continues to be highlighted in the ancient city of Elbasan, it is celebrated by all Albanians.

A Red and White wool bracelet called "Verore" is worn to celebrate the beginning of summer. This along with other March Summer Balkan traditions is a UNESCO recognized "intangible cultural heritage".

The holiday maintains a family and traditional atmosphere, in which parents, children and families celebrate together. On this day Albanians congratulate each other on living long and happy lives. Families would jump over a small fire signifying a full cleasing going into a new year. Comminly know as "shedding the fleas". The name comes from older albanians jumping through campfires to rid themselves of actual fleas.

See also
Culture of Albania
Albanian folk beliefs
Ballokume

Sources

Citations

Bibliography

Albanian culture
Albanian traditions
Festivals in Albania
March observances
Folk festivals in Albania
Spring (season) events in Albania
Events in Elbasan